Bolivaroscelis carinata is a species of praying mantis in the family Amorphoscelidae.

See also
List of mantis genera and species

References

Bolivaroscelis
Insects described in 1908